The 2018 Sandwell Metropolitan Borough Council election took place on 3 May 2018 to elect members of Sandwell Metropolitan Borough Council in England.  This was on the same day as other local elections.

Results Summary

Ward Results

Abbey

Blackheath

Bristnall

Charlemont with Grove Vale

Cradley Heath and Old Hill

Friar Park

Great Barr with Yew Tree

Great Bridge

Greets Green and Lyng

Hateley Heath

Langley

Newton

Old Warley

Oldbury

Princes End

Rowley

Smethwick

Soho and Victoria

St Paul's

Tipton Green

Tividale

Wednesbury North

Wednesbury South

West Bromwich Central

References

2018 English local elections
2018
2010s in the West Midlands (county)